Anna of Turov (?-1205), was a Grand Princess of the Kiev by marriage to Rurik Rostislavich, Grand Prince of Kiev (r. 1173, 1180–1182, 1194–1202, 1203–1205, 1206, 1207–1210).  She is described in the Kiew chronicle as an ideal of pious charity.

References

Year of birth unknown
Date of death unknown
Kievan Rus' princesses
12th-century Rus' women
13th-century Rus' women